The 2014 Winter Paralympics medal table is a list of National Paralympic Committees ranked by the number of medals won during the 2014 Winter Paralympics, which were held in Sochi, Russia from 7 to 16 March. Athletes from 45 nations participated in 72 events in five sports. The Russian team became the leader of the medal count, effectively collecting 37% of all medals. However, following the Games, the IPC discovered evidence that Russia's performance has been aided by a wider state-sponsored doping program.

Medal table

The ranking in this table is based on information provided by the International Paralympic Committee (IPC) and is consistent with IPC convention in its published medal tables. By default, the table is ordered by the number of gold medals the athletes from a nation have won (in this context, a "nation" is an entity represented by a National Paralympic Committee). The number of silver medals is taken into consideration next and then the number of bronze medals. If nations are still tied, equal ranking is given and they are listed alphabetically by IPC country code.

See also
 2014 Winter Olympics medal table

References
General

 

Specific

External links
Sochi2014 

Medal table
Russia sport-related lists
Winter Paralympics medal tables